The Tall Man is a half-hour American western television series about Sheriff Pat Garrett and gunfighter Billy the Kid that aired on NBC from September 10, 1960, to September 1, 1962, filmed by Revue Productions.

Created and produced by Samuel Peeples, the series is set in New Mexico in the late 1870s and also depicts other figures of the period, such as John Tunstall and Lew Wallace.

Sponsors included Beech-Nut Life Savers.

Synopsis

The Tall Man stars 6'3" Barry Sullivan as Sheriff Pat Garrett, and Clu Gulager as Billy the Kid.

In the premiere episode, "Garrett and the Kid" (September 10, 1960), Garrett arrives in Lincoln, depicted in the series as a gold-mining boomtown, as the new deputy sheriff, only to learn that a crooked saloon owner, Paul Mason (Robert Middleton), dominates the community, including the marshal, Dave Leggert (Denver Pyle). When he sees his power threatened, Mason tries to hire Billy to kill Garrett, unaware that the two were then on friendly terms. Vaughn Taylor is cast in this episode as Judge Riley, and King Donovan appears as a Mason henchman.

Marianna Hill was cast in several episodes as one of Billy's girlfriends, Rita. In one episode, Robert Lansing played the frontier dentist, gambler, and gunfighter John H. "Doc" Holliday in the episode "Rovin' Gambler."

Cast

 Barry Sullivan as Sheriff Pat Garrett
 Clu Gulager as Billy the Kid.

Andy Clyde was cast in five episodes as Pa McBeam; Judy Nugent plays McBean's daughter, June. Different actress were cast as the other daughter, May. Olive Sturgess played the part of May in "McBean Rides Again" (Nº 13), "The Reluctant Bridegroom" (Nº 23), and "Millionaire McBean" (Nº 31). Andy Clyde also appeared at the time in the role of the neighboring farmer George MacMichael on ABC's The Real McCoys, starring Walter Brennan.

Other guest stars
In addition to the aforementioned, other actors appearing on The Tall Man in individual episodes include:

 Claude Akins
 Chris Alcaide
 John Anderson
 R.G. Armstrong
 Malcolm Atterbury
 Patricia Barry
 Don Beddoe
 Russ Bender
 Lyle Bettger
 Lane Bradford
 Jocelyn Brando
 Hank Brandt
 X Brands
 Edgar Buchanan
 Michael Burns
 Robert Burton
 Harry Carey, Jr.
 Paul Carr
 John Cliff
 James Coburn
 Iron Eyes Cody
 Jim Davis
 Cyril Delevanti
 Richard Devon
 Pamela Duncan
 Faith Domergue
 Jena Engstrom
 William Fawcett
 Mona Freeman
 Robert Griffin
 Herman Hack
 Chick Hannan
 Ron Harper
 Don C. Harvey
 Raymond Hatton
 Rex Holman
 Rodolfo Hoyos Jr.

 Clegg Hoyt
 Kathleen Hughes
 Tommy Ivo
 Richard Jaeckel
 I. Stanford Jolley
 Ray Kellogg
 Sandy Kenyon
 Michael Landon
 Nan Leslie
 Herbert Lytton
 Adele Mara
 Howard McNear
 Don Megowan
 Jan Merlin
 Mark Miller
 Vic Morrow
 Leonard Nimoy
 Gregg Palmer
 James Parnell
 Dennis Patrick
 William Phipps
 Ford Rainey
 Richard Reeves
 Stafford Repp
 Addison Richards
 Julie Sommars 
 Harold J. Stone
 Kelly Thordsen
 Regis Toomey
 Harry von Zell
 Ralph Votrian
 Gregory Walcott
 Patrick Waltz
 Robert J. Wilke
 Elen Willard

Critical response
Jack Gould, in a review in The New York Times, called the program "a characteristic item of uninventive tripe". He described Sullivan's portrayal of Garrett as "an official who exudes sternness, physique, and no-think" and, comparing Gulager's Billy the Kid to Edd Byrnes's character on 77 Sunset Strip, as "made to resemble a Kookie of the sagebrush".

Episode list

Season 1: 1960–61

Season 2: 1961–62

Release

Home Media
On October 30, 2007, Timeless Media Group released fifteen episodes of the series on a Region 1 three-DVD set in the United States.

On December 6, 2011, Timeless Media Group released  The Tall Man- The Complete TV Series on DVD in Region 1.

References

External links
 

1960 American television series debuts
1962 American television series endings
1960s American drama television series
Television series set in the 1870s
Television series set in the 1880s
English-language television shows
Cultural depictions of Billy the Kid
Cultural depictions of Pat Garrett
Cultural depictions of Doc Holliday
NBC original programming
Television series by Universal Television
1960s Western (genre) television series
Black-and-white American television shows
Television shows set in New Mexico